The Robot Scientist's Daughter is a book of poetry by Jeannine Hall Gailey, published by Mayapple Press in 2015. This collection, Gailey's fourth, deals with ecological issues, with a specific focus on the potential dangers of the nuclear industry, set against the backdrop of growing up in Oak Ridge, Tennessee, in the 1970s. "The poems that make up this collection move in a controlled way between fact and fiction, autobiography and fantasy, giving readers glimpses into the secret world surrounding ORNL in which Gailey grew up, at the same time as they tell the story of a fictional Robot Scientist's Daughter who was transformed by that world into something other, something monstrous."

Awards
Won second place in the 2016 Elgin Awards for full-length poetry books published in 2014 and 2015; presented by the Science Fiction Poetry Association (SFPA).
Semifinalist in the 2015 Goodreads Choice Awards in the Poetry category.

Reviews
Critical reviews of The Robot Scientist's Daughter have appeared in the following literary publications:
 Escape Into Life
 Poetry International
 The Rumpus
 San Francisco Book Review
 Savvy Verse & Wit
 The Seattle Times
 Strange Horizons
 Tweetspeak

References

External links
 Mayapple Press Web site
 Jeannine Hall Gailey's Web site 
 The Robot Scientist's Daughter page on Amazon.com

American poetry collections
2015 poetry books